No. 6 Helicopter Squadron is a squadron of the Sri Lanka Air Force. It currently operates Mil Mi-17s from SLAF Anuradhapura for troop transport.

History
The squadron was formed on March 15, 1993 SLAF Katunayake with the arrival of Mil Mi-17s. It was later moved to SLAF Vavuniya on April 29, 1993. The unit is tasked with the air movement of the Air Mobile Brigade of the Sri Lanka Army.

In 2014, Sri Lanka Air Force deployed an aviation unit, No. 62 Helicopter Flight under the United Nations Mission in the Central African Republic and Chad, with three Mi-17 helicopters from the No. 6 Helicopter Squadron along with 122 personnel consisting pilots, engineers and other supporting staff. This was followed by a deployment to the United Nations Mission in South Sudan.

In March 2021, the squadron was presented with the President’s Colours by President Gotabaya Rajapaksa.

Aircraft operated
Year of introduction
Mil Mi-17 - 1993

Notable members
 Air Chief Marshal Gagan Bulathsinghala
 Air Chief Marshal Kapila Jayampathy
 Air Chief Marshal Sumangala Dias
 Air Vice Marshal Kapila Wanigasooriya

References

External links
Sri Lanka Air Force  Base Katunayake 
www.scramble.nl
Sri Lanka Air Force Old Wings New Wings
Ruling the sky 
 rise of No 6 Helicopter Squadron of SLAF

Military units and formations established in 1993
6